Moša Pijade (alternate English transliteration Moshe Piade; 4 January 1890 – 15 March 1957), nicknamed Čiča Janko (lit. "Old Man Janko") was a  Serbian and Yugoslav communist of Jewish origin, a close collaborator of Josip Broz Tito, Yugoslav politician, and full member of the Serbian Academy of Sciences and Arts.

Life and career
Pijade was of Sephardic Jewish parentage. In his youth, Pijade was a painter, art critic and publicist. He was also known for translating Das Kapital by Karl Marx into Serbo-Croatian, together with Rodoljub Čolaković.

He is thought to have had a major influence on Marxist ideology as exposed during the old regime in the Kingdom of Yugoslavia. In 1925, he was sentenced to 20 years in prison because of his 'revolutionary activities' after World War I. He was discharged after 14 years in 1939 and imprisoned again in 1941 in the camp Bileća.

World War II 

Pijade was one of the leaders of the Uprising in Montenegro. His ruthless cruelty toward the people who refused to join his units was noted. He was subsequently recalled to the communist headquarters because of the issues connected to the uprising. Under the influence of Pijade and Milovan Đilas an extreme prosecution of "leftist errors" was pursued by the Partisans in Montenegro.

In March 1942, Pijade met British envoy in occupied Yugoslavia Terence Atherton and took him on a tour of inspection of the organization of the communist forces in Žabljak.

Pijade was known as the creator of the so-called 'Foča regulations' (1942), which prescribed the foundation and activity of people's liberation committees in the liberated territories during the war against the Nazis. In November 1943, before the second AVNOJ meeting in Jajce, he initiated the foundation of Tanjug, which later became the state news agency of SFR Yugoslavia, nowadays of Serbia.

Pijade held high political posts during World War II and was a member of the Central Committee and the Politburo of the Communist Party of Yugoslavia, being one of leaders of Tito's partisans.

Later career 
For his services during the war, Pijade was subsequently proclaimed People's Hero of Yugoslavia, and continued to maintain an important role in the newly proclaimed Federal People's Republic of Yugoslavia. He was one of six Vice Presidents of the Presidium of the Yugoslavian Parliament (deputy head of state) 1945–53.

In 1948 Pijade convinced Tito to allow those Jews who remained in Yugoslavia to emigrate to Israel. Tito agreed on a one-time exception basis. As a result, 3,000 Jews emigrated from Yugoslavia to Israel on the SS Kefalos in December 1948. Among those was Tommy Lapid, who became Deputy Prime Minister of Israel and was the father of Yair Lapid.

After having led the law commission of the Parliament, Pijade was vice-president (1953–54) and President of the Yugoslavian Parliament or Skupština (1954–55). In 1957, he died in Paris during the return from a visit to London, where he had talks as leader of a Yugoslav parliamentary delegation. Streets in many cities of the former Yugoslav countries were once named after him.

See also
 Titoism
 Collectivism and individualism
 Edvard Kardelj

Notes

References

 
 
 Sephardic Jews and Communism
 

1890 births
1957 deaths
Politicians from Belgrade
Serbian people of World War II
Yugoslav Partisans members
Serbian Sephardi Jews
Jewish socialists
Recipients of the Order of the People's Hero
League of Communists of Serbia politicians
Central Committee of the League of Communists of Yugoslavia members
Jews in the Yugoslav Partisans
Recipients of Order of the Holy Trinity (Ethiopia)
Recipients of the Order of the Hero of Socialist Labour